Queenstown Rosenwald School, also known as Sunnyside School, is a historic Rosenwald school building located at Severn in Anne Arundel County, Maryland, United States.  It was built in 1932 and is a plain, one-story, frame building. The building contained two classrooms and a library. The school closed in 1966 and subsequently became the Queenstown Community Center.

It was listed on the National Register of Historic Places in 2009.

See also
Lula G. Scott Community Center

References

External links
, at Maryland Historical Trust

Rosenwald schools in Maryland
School buildings on the National Register of Historic Places in Maryland
Buildings and structures in Anne Arundel County, Maryland
School buildings completed in 1932
Severn, Maryland
National Register of Historic Places in Anne Arundel County, Maryland
1932 establishments in Maryland